Charusa may refer to:
Charusa District, an administrative subdivision of Iran
Qaleh Raisi, a city in Iran, capital of the above